Shorne is a village and civil parish in the borough of Gravesham in Kent, England. Most of the land is well-drained but its marshes, the Shorne Marshes reach down to the Thames Estuary and are an SSSI amid the North Kent Marshes on the Hoo Peninsula proper.

History
Shorne Barrow (or tumulus) and Randalls Wood Barrow are indications of stone age occupation.

Randall Manor was a 14th-century manor, the remains of which are in Shorne Wood Country Park.

Demographics
According to the census results for 2001 there were 2,485 people in 1,028 households in the Parish of Shorne. Of those residents between the ages of 16 to 74, 60% had a higher qualification (at level 2 to 5) and 86% of the dwellings were owner occupied.
The population of Shorne Parish at the 2011 census was 2487 residents in 1033 households.[2]

Transport
In April 2017, it was announced that the government choice for the Lower Thames Crossing was for a tunnel under the Thames between East Tilbury and Shorne.

Places of interest
Much of upper Shorne is a conservation area with thirteen listed buildings and many others of interest. These include:

Pipes Place is in Forge Lane almost opposite Little St, Katherines. A local magistrate, Richard Parker lived on the site in 1642. Jarvis Maplesden the grandson of a local tanner purchased the house early in the 18th century along with twenty acres of land, which included St. Katharine's Chapel. Several generations of the Maplesden family lived in the house and there are gravestones bearing the Maplesden name still in the churchyard. The Maplesden family is responsible for its present build and design in the Georgian style. In about 1870, George Arnold, Mayor of Gravesend, bought and restored the ruined chapel.

References

External links

 Shorne Parish History
 Shorne Parish Council
 Discover Gravesham
 Shorne Marshes Nature Reserve – RSPB

civil parishes in Kent
Gravesham
populated places on the River Thames
villages in Kent